Oliver Pötschke (born 13 February 1987) is a retired footballer who played as a centre-back. Born and raised in Germany, he represented the Philippines internationally.

Early life
Pötschke was born and raised in Berlin to a German father and a Filipina mother.

Club career
Pötschke belonged to the Hertha BSC youth rank for six years, being in one of them a teammate of both Jérôme and Kevin-Prince Boateng.

References

1987 births
Living people
Footballers from Berlin
German footballers
Filipino footballers
Association football central defenders
BFC Preussen players
Landesliga players
Philippines international footballers
German sportspeople of Filipino descent
Filipino people of German descent
Citizens of the Philippines through descent